Wassup Rockers is a 2005 drama film directed by Larry Clark.

Plot
Wassup Rockers is about a group of Guatemalan American and Salvadoran American teenagers in South Los Angeles who, instead of conforming to the hip hop culture of their gang-infested neighborhood, wear tight pants, listen to punk rock, and ride skateboards. Avoiding the violence of their dangerous home turf is an everyday challenge. The climax of the film occurs out on a skate-ride around Beverly Hills, California. Racial tension fumes the air of Beverly Hills as the pack of skaters effortlessly manages to coincidentally run into trouble.  Janice Dickinson makes an appearance in the film as a rich alcoholic divorcee and former soap opera actress whose Spanish-speaking maid helps Los Rockers. Fashion designer Jeremy Scott appears as a photographer.

Cast 

 Jonathan Velasquez as Jonathan
 Francisco Pedrasa as Kiko
 Milton Velasquez as Milton
 Usualdo Panameno as Porky 
 Eddie Velasquez as Eddie
 Luis Rojas-Salgado as Louie
 Carlos Velasco as Carlos
 Iris Zelaya as Iris
 Ashley Maldonado as Rosalia
 Laura Cellner as Jade
 Jessica Steinbaum as Nikki
 Jeremy Scott as Andre

Critical response
The film currently holds a 37% "rotten" score on Rotten Tomatoes based on 52 reviews, with the consensus reading "As usual with Clark's films, the fixation on kids is rather creepy, plus the plot eventually runs off the rails into camp." On Metacritic, the film has a score of 56 based on 23 critics, indicating mixed or average reviews. Film critic Roger Ebert gave Wassup Rockers a "thumbs up" rating on the television show Ebert & Roeper. In contrast, his co-host, Richard Roeper, gave the movie a "thumbs (way) down", emphasizing Larry Clark's apparent fascination with shirtless, adolescent males. Roeper argued, "When a colleague told me I was about to see a new film from Larry Clark, the director of Bully and Kids, I said, 'I wonder how many scenes will pass before we get shirtless teenage boys?' That's one of Clark's rather disturbing obsessions." Ebert ultimately gave the film 3 out of 4 stars on his website.

See also
Kids (1995, Larry Clark)
Bully (2001, Larry Clark)
Ken Park (2002, Larry Clark)

References

External links

Films directed by Larry Clark
Punk films
Skateboarding films
2005 comedy-drama films
2005 films
American comedy-drama films
2005 comedy films
2005 drama films
2000s American films